Omoka is the larger of the two main settlements on Penrhyn Atoll in the Cook Islands. It is the location of the Penrhyn island Council, and is located on Moananui Islet in the far west of Penrhyn Atoll. 

The small village has two main roads running through it with four connecting roads, one of which marking the end of the village where the land ends. It is home to between 100 and 200 residents and includes approximately 150 buildings, including the islands council building, Penrhyn hospital, and a Cook Islands Christian Church.

References

Populated places in the Cook Islands
Penrhyn atoll